Schismus arabicus is a species of grass known by the common name Arabian schismus. It is native to northern Africa, temperate Asia, and it is also known as an introduced species in the southwestern United States. It grows in many types of habitat, including disturbed areas. It is an annual grass with stems growing up to 16 centimeters long and lined with threadlike leaves. The short inflorescence bears spikelets under a centimeter long.

References

External links
Jepson Manual Treatment
USDA Plants Profile
Grass Manual Treatment
Photo gallery

Danthonioideae
Grasses of Asia
Flora of North Africa
Flora of Northeast Tropical Africa
Flora of temperate Asia
Flora of West Himalaya
Flora of Pakistan